The Art of War II: Betrayal is a 2008 action film directed by Josef Rusnak and starring Wesley Snipes, Lochlyn Munro and Athena Karkanis. It is the sequel to the 2000 film The Art of War. The film was released on direct-to-DVD in the United States on August 12, 2008.

Premise 
When Agent Neil Shaw comes out of hiding to vindicate his former mentor's murder, he winds up on the trail of betrayal and lethal corruption. Under the charge of his friend and a senatorial candidate, his mission is to set things straight. But when more people turn up dead, Shaw realizes that he's been set up as bait.

Cast

Release 
It has sold 206,604 DVD units for a gross of $4,013,907.

Reception 
David Walker of DVD Talk rated it 0.5/5 stars and called it an unnecessary, poorly-made sequel.  Preston Jones, also of DVD Talk, rated it 1.5/5 stars and called it "painfully contrived and unnecessary".  David Johnson of DVD Verdict wrote that the film is "a ponderous, sometimes ridiculous affair featuring a needlessly complicated plot, lazy performances and empty fight choreography."  Joe Leydon of Variety called it "a tired and uninspired sequel".

References

External links 
 

2008 films
2008 direct-to-video films
2008 action films
American action films
American martial arts films
American films about revenge
Canadian action films
Canadian films about revenge
Direct-to-video sequel films
Films set in British Columbia
Films shot in Vancouver
Stage 6 Films films
2008 martial arts films
The Art of War films
2000s English-language films
Films directed by Josef Rusnak
2000s American films
2000s Canadian films